Penthouse most often refers to:

Penthouse apartment, a special apartment on the top floor of a building
Penthouse (magazine), a British-founded men's magazine
Mechanical penthouse, a floor, typically located directly under a flat-roof, that houses mechanical equipment

Penthouse may also refer to:

Film and television
Penthouse (film), a 1933 American film
The Penthouse (1967 film), a British film directed by Peter Collinson
The Penthouse (1989 film), an American-Canadian television film directed by David Greene
The Penthouse (2010 film), an American film directed by Chris Levitus
Penthouse (Australian TV series), a 1960–1961 daytime interview show
Penthouse (Mexican TV series), a 1973 telenovela
The Penthouse: War in Life, a 2020–2021 television series
Penthouse HDTV, a TV channel

Music
Penthouse (album), a 1995 album by Luna
The Penthouse (Seattle), a 1960s jazz club in Seattle, Washington, US
Penthouse Records, a Jamaican record label

See also
The Penthouse Club, a 1970–1978 Australian TV variety programme
 Pentheus, mythological king of Thebes
 The Pent House, listed building in Plympton, Devon, England